Lubao is a 1st class municipality in the province of Pampanga, Philippines.

Lubao may also refer to:
 Lubao, Democratic Republic of the Congo
 Lubao, Foshan, a town in Sanshui county, Guangdong province, China